Mag Bodard (3 January 1916 – 26 February 2019) was an Italian-born French film producer, known for The Umbrellas of Cherbourg, Donkey Skin, and The Young Girls of Rochefort.

Life
Bodard was born in Turin as Margherita Maria Renata Perato. She was a journalist working for women's magazine Elle before going into film producing.  In 1962 she married the reporter Lucien Bodard, whom she had met in southeast Asia, and the two subsequently moved to Paris. Through his contacts she became an editor for the newspaper France-Soir, where she began an affair with its owner Pierre Lazareff.

Bodard's first film was The Dance in 1962. Two years later she produced the musical The Umbrellas of Cherbourg, which won the Palm d'Or at the Cannes Film Festival. The film was also nominated for two Academy Awards, a Golden Globe, and a Grammy.

Bodard would go on to produce several dozen more films and worked with renowned directors such as Agnès Varda on Le Bonheur, Jean-Luc Goddard on 2 or 3 Things I Know About Her and La Chinoise, Robert Bresson on Au Hasard Balthazar and A Gentle Woman, and Alain Resnais on Je t'aime, je t'aime. She promoted the careers of directors such as Maurice Pialat, Nina Companeez, and Claude Miller.

She opened her own production company Parc Films, which ran from 1963 to 1972, and was supported by Lazareff. The company was dissolved after Lazareff died.

In 1977 she shifted from cinema to television. She produced her last television film, Inconnue de la départementale, in 2006 at the age of ninety.

In 2005, a documentary about her life, Mag Bodard, un destin, was directed by Anne Wiazemsky. She celebrated her hundredth birthday in 2016. She died in Neuilly-sur-Seine at the age of 103.

Selected filmography
 1962: The Dance
 1964: The Umbrellas of Cherbourg
 1965: Happiness
 1966: Au Hasard Balthazar
 1967: Two or Three Things I Know About Her
 1967: The Young Girls of Rochefort
 1967: La Chinoise
 1968: Benjamin
 1968: Je t'aime, je t'aime
 1969: A Gentle Woman
 1970: La maison des Bories
 1970: Donkey Skin
 1979: Les Dames de la côte (TV miniseries)
 1989: La Grande Cabriole (TV miniseries)
 2006: Inconnue de la départementale

References

External links

1916 births
2019 deaths
French centenarians
French film producers
Women centenarians
French women film producers
Italian emigrants to France
Film people from Turin
French television producers
Women television producers